Agriphila tersellus is a species of moth in the family Crambidae. The species was described by Julius Lederer in 1855. It is found in Spain, Portugal, France, Italy, Austria, Croatia, Slovakia, Hungary, Romania, Bulgaria, Greece, Morocco, Algeria, Tunisia, Asia Minor, Turkmenistan, Syria, Lebanon, Iran and Transcaucasia.

The wingspan is 22–26 mm.

References

Moths described in 1855
Crambini
Moths of Europe
Moths of Africa
Moths of Asia